Bradley Ryan Trost  (born May 15, 1974) is a former Canadian politician who served as a Conservative Member of Parliament in the House of Commons of Canada, representing the ridings of Saskatoon—Humboldt from 2004 to 2015 and Saskatoon—University from 2015 to 2019. He was a candidate in the 2017 Conservative Party of Canada leadership election, finishing fourth. Trost was known for his support of socially conservative positions.

Early and personal life
Before being elected, Trost worked as an exploration and mining geophysicist. Trost holds a B.Sc. in Geophysics and a B.A. in Economics, both from the University of Saskatchewan. He married in August 2012.

Political career 

In 2004, in what was the closest four-way race in the country, Trost received 417 more votes than second place candidate, the New Democratic Party's (NDP) Nettie Wiebe, 435 votes ahead of the third place candidate, Liberal Patrick Wolfe, and 2368 votes ahead of former Canadian Alliance Member of Parliament Jim Pankiw.

Trost was re-elected, in 2006, 2008, and 2011 earning between 49–53% of the vote defeating the second place NDP, and the third place Liberals in Saskatoon-Humboldt in each election. In the federal election on October 19, 2015, Trost was elected in the new urban riding of Saskatoon-University with 41.5% of the vote.

Parliament activity 
In November 2015, Trost was named the Conservative Critic for Canada/U.S. Relations by Interim Leader Rona Ambrose, Leader of the Opposition.

Trost has been an outspoken critic of moves toward a carbon tax, arguing that such a tax kills jobs and blocks job creation. In a series of House of Commons Order Paper Questions, Trost questioned the benefits of a carbon tax and raised concerns as to its effects on Canada's economy.

Brad served as a member on the House of Commons Standing Committee on Natural Resources. He has also served as a member of the International Trade Committee and before that, the Industry Committee. He is the founder of the Conservative Party's Energy Caucus and is a member of the Parliamentary Pro-Life Caucus. He has also served as an elected vice-chair of the Canada-U.S. Parliamentary Association.

In the 40th Parliament Trost introduced private members legislation into the House of Commons that would open the Canadian uranium mining sector to increased foreign investment.

As a Member of the Standing Committee on International Trade Trost was an outspoken supporter of the Canada–Colombia Free Trade Agreement.

Conservative leadership run

Trost announced his entry into the 2017 Conservative Party of Canada leadership election in the summer of 2016, saying that "I believe the Conservative Party needs what I'm calling a full spectrum conservative candidate."  Campaign Life Coalition endorsed candidates Trost and Pierre Lemieux in the 2017 Conservative leadership election. Between August 2016 and May 2017, Trost campaigned to become Leader of the Conservative Party of Canada. He was the third runner-up in a field of thirteen candidates, being eliminated on the tenth ballot after coming in fourth behind frontrunner Maxime Bernier, eventual winner Andrew Scheer, and Erin O'Toole, who would be elected leader of the party in 2020.

After the leadership race 
After the election, Trost's leadership campaign was fined $50,000 by the Conservative Party for allegedly leaking the party's membership list to the National Firearms Association.  On February 11, 2019, the Conservative Party released a statement from its Leadership Election Organizing Committee (LEOC) which concluded: "In short, LEOC does not believe there is evidence that the Trost Campaign was responsible for leaking of the membership list...." The fine was therefore removed from the Brad Trost Campaign. Trost lost the renomination as the party candidate for his riding during the 43rd Federal election on March 10 to Corey Tochor, former speaker of the Saskatchewan Legislature.

Positions 

Trost has been noted for publicly taking fiscally and socially conservative stances. In July 2016, Trost took definitive positions on everything from taxes, deficit financing and a carbon tax to the legalization of marijuana and transgender bathrooms.

During an unofficial debate in November 2016 between 9 Conservative Leadership in contenders, Trost stated: "I don't' believe climate change is a real threat.

In July 2009, Trost criticized his own government's funding of Toronto Pride Week under the $100 million Marquee Tourism Events stimulus program.

In November 2009, Trost launched a petition to stop the federal government's funding of the International Planned Parenthood Federation (IPPF). According to Trost's petition, the IPPF "promotes the establishment of abortion as an international human right and lobbies aggressively to impose permissive abortion laws on developing nations." During the 2011 federal election campaign, Trost made news when he spoke at a Saskatchewan Pro-life Association convention and noted to the audience that the government had not renewed funding to Planned Parenthood over the previous year and urged continued support for their defunding.

In September 2011, Trost publicly voiced his anger at the federal government's decision to fund the International Planned Parenthood Federation. He said that Conservative MPs' requests that the Prime Minister's Office cease funding have been ignored.

In January 2012, Trost criticized the strict party discipline imposed upon Conservative MPs, saying it stifled debate and independent thought.

Trost was one of the few MPs at the 2016 Conservative policy convention who insisted on retaining the party's definition of marriage as "the Union of one man and one woman". On May 4, 2017 Trost sent a private member's bill to the floor to privatize the CBC, Canada's national public broadcaster, and upon its second reading it was defeated 260 to 6, with only himself and five other Conservative members voting for the bill.

Electoral record

References

External links
 Parliamentary website
 Leadership campaign website
 
 Voting record

1974 births
Conservative Party of Canada MPs
Members of the House of Commons of Canada from Saskatchewan
Politicians from Saskatoon
Canadian geophysicists
University of Saskatchewan alumni
21st-century Canadian politicians
Canadian anti-abortion activists
Living people